The M74 mortar is designed by Military Technical Institute in Yugoslavia. It is smooth bore, muzzle-loading, high-angle-of-fire weapon used for long-range indirect fire support. Today they are produced by Serbian company PPT Namenska and BNT from Bosnia and Herzegovina.

Description
This mortar can be deployed as infantry support for destruction of personnel and enemy firing positions, for opening routes through barbed wire obstacles and mine fields, for demolition of fortified objects, for destructing infrastructure elements, illumination and deploying smoke screen. 
The M74 model when disassembled could be carried by 3 soldiers thus having unique capabilities regarding transport in area with obstacles or in urban area compared with more heavier mortars.  M74 provides 12 rds per minute rate of fire and it is intended to be used to deliver 15-20 mines before moving to another position.  Since it is very light regarding its caliber it can be easily airdropped and parachuted to firing position. It uses NSB-4B sight for firing. Base-plate of M74 mortar is triangle shaped.

Specifications

Operators

Current operators

Former operators

See also 
 Soltam K6 
 Mortier 120mm Rayé Tracté Modèle F1
 120 KRH 92
 Light mortar 120mm M75

References

External links 
 

Artillery of Serbia
Infantry mortars
Mortars of Yugoslavia
120mm mortars
Military equipment introduced in the 1980s